Kilday is a surname. Notable people with the surname include:

 Andrea Kilday (born 1982), New Zealand Taekwondo fighter
 Lee Kilday (born 1992), Scottish footballer
 Lowell C. Kilday (1931-2011), American diplomat
 Paul J. Kilday (1900-1968), U.S. Representative for Texas